Frederick Wilson Popenoe (March 9, 1892 – June 20, 1975) was an American Department of Agriculture employee and plant explorer. From 1916 to 1924, Popenoe explored Latin America to look for new strains of avocados. He reported his adventures to the National Geographic Society. He went to work for the U.S. Department of Agriculture in 1913 and became the chief agronomist of the United Fruit Company in 1925.

Career 
Popenoe attended Pomona College as a special student for one year. Afterwards, he worked for the United Fruit Company, where he became the first director of the Panamerican Agricultural School, Zamorano in Honduras. Popenoe won numerous awards and received three honorary doctorates, from: Universidad Mayor de San Marcos in Lima, Peru;  Pomona College; and the University of Florida in Gainesville, Florida.

Personal life 
Popenoe was married to the British archeologist Dorothy Popenoe, who was involved in excavation of the Playa de los Muertos in Honduras. 

His brother was agricultural explorer, eugenicist, and marriage counselor Paul Popenoe.

References

External links
Biography of Wilson Popenoe

1892 births
1975 deaths
United States Department of Agriculture officials
American naturalists
Pomona College alumni
20th-century naturalists
American expatriates in Honduras